Cristóbal Pérez Pastor (1833–1906) was a Spanish archivist and literary historian.

Works
 La imprenta en Toledo [Printing in Toledo], 1887
 Bibliografía madrileña del siglo XVI [Madrid bibliography of the 16th century], 3 vols, 1891, 1906, 1907
 La imprenta en Medina del Campo [Printing in Medina del Campo], 1895
 Proceso de Lope de Vega [Trial of Lope de Vega], 1901
 Nuevos datos acerca del histrionismo español en los siglos XVI y XVII [New facts relating to Spanish acting in the 16th and 17th centuries], 1901
 Documentos cervantinos, 2 vols, 1897-1902
 Documentos para la biografia de Calderon, 1905
 Noticias y documentos... recogidos por... Pérez Pastor, 4 vols, 1910-1926

References

1833 births
1906 deaths
Spanish male writers
Spanish archivists
Spanish literary historians